Blái hnötturinn is an album by the Icelandic group múm. It is a soundtrack composed for the children's play Blái hnötturinn (The Blue Planet) by Andri Snær Magnason. All profits revert to the Red Cross.

Track listing
 Untitled – 2:26
 Untitled – 4:20
 Untitled – 0:16
 Untitled – 0:57
 Untitled – 0:30
 Untitled – 1:00
 Untitled – 1:38
 Untitled – 1:34
 Untitled – 3:26
 Untitled – 2:33
 Untitled – 3:30
 Untitled – 3:19
 Untitled – 1:19
 Untitled – 0:50
 Untitled – 2:31
 Untitled – 3:40
 Untitled – 0:22

External links
Andri Snær Magnason's website , with information about the play

Múm albums
2001 soundtrack albums
Theatre soundtracks

sv:Blái Hnötturinn